Torodora retardata is a moth in the family Lecithoceridae. It was described by László Anthony Gozmány in 1973. It is found in Nepal.

References

Moths described in 1973
Torodora